Tim Hampton (February 25, 1948 – March 11, 2013) was a British film producer and studio executive.  From 1979 to 1983, he was the European production executive and managing director at 20th Century Fox Productions.

Personal life and death
Hampton attended Bishop Wordsworth's School and resided in Farnham.

Through his marriage to Sally Hampton, he was the father of three sons: Matthew, Piers and Tom.  At the time of his death, Hampton was married to Anna Hampton.

Hampton died on March 11, 2013, at the age of 65.

Filmography

References

External links
 

1948 births
2013 deaths
People from Farnham
British film producers
20th Century Studios people
People educated at Bishop Wordsworth's School